Laurance Thomas Dow (February 13, 1893 – March 29, 1956) was a Canadian politician. He served in the Legislative Assembly of New Brunswick as member of the Progressive Conservative party from 1944 to 1948.

References

1893 births
1956 deaths
20th-century Canadian politicians
Progressive Conservative Party of New Brunswick MLAs
Politicians from Saint John, New Brunswick